Shelmaliers is a Gaelic Athletic Association club based in Castlebridge, County Wexford, Ireland. The club was founded in 1886, with the name Shelmaliers being adopted in 1952, and fields teams in hurling, Gaelic football and camogie.

Location
Shelmaliers represents a parish of three centres – historic Castlebridge, Screen at the northern end, and the seaside area of Curracloe. The club is in the "over the water" area, just north of the town of Wexford.

History
Evidence suggests that the game of hurling had been played in the area long before the foundation of the Gaelic Athletic Association in 1884. Two years later in 1886 the club played its first game under the auspices of the association – a game of football against Our Lady's Island in October 1886.

Over the next fifty years the club, under various names such as the Emmets, the Redmonds, and the Sally Beachers, enjoyed a golden age, winning thirteen senior hurling titles and one senior football title. The club represented Wexford in the All-Ireland championship on five occasions. Their finest hour was in 1910, when Wexford, represented by Castlebridge, won its first All-Ireland senior hurling title.

The Shelmaliers name was adopted in 1952, when the old Ibars and Ardcolm clubs merged. County junior hurling titles followed in 1954 and 1966.

Other titles have been annexed in the intervening period, winning a junior football championship in 1985, and an intermediate hurling title in 1997.

John Hegarty managed the club to the Wexford SFC. He was still Shelmaliers manager when the County Board appointed him as manager of the county football team in 2022. He continued as club manager for the SFC.

Facilities
The 1970s saw the club move to its present grounds at Hollymount, the start of a process of development which is continuing today. The club now have three pitches, and have purchased land for a fourth pitch.

Notable players

 Ross Banville
 Brian Doyle
 Jack Harding
 Séamus Hearne
 Mick Morrissey
 Eoghan O'Gara, the Dublin All-Ireland SFC winner, transferred to the club in 2022 as his wife is from there

Honours
 Wexford Senior Hurling Championship (2): 2014, 2020
 Wexford Intermediate Football Championship  (1): 2007
 Wexford Intermediate Hurling Championship (1): 1997
 Wexford Junior Football Championship (2): 1973, 1985 
 Wexford Junior Hurling Championship (3): 1954, 1966, 1988
 Wexford Under-21 Football Championship (6) 2003, 2004, 2010, 2013, 2014, 2016
 Wexford Under-21 Hurling Championship (2) 2008, 2009
 Wexford Minor Football Championship (5) 2003, 2004, 2010, 2011, 2012
 Wexford Minor Hurling Championship (4) 2006, 2007, 2008, 2009

References

External links
Shelmaliers GAA Club website

Gaelic games clubs in County Wexford
Hurling clubs in County Wexford
Gaelic football clubs in County Wexford